Rival Cadeau-Payet (born May 13, 1964) is a former light middleweight boxer from Seychelles. He represented his country at the 1990 Commonwealth Games,
1992 Summer Olympics, 1994 Commonwealth Games (in which he won a bronze medal), 1995 All-Africa Games (in which he won silver) and at the 1996 Summer Olympics.

References

External links
 
 

1964 births
Living people
Seychellois male boxers
Light-middleweight boxers
Olympic boxers of Seychelles
Boxers at the 1992 Summer Olympics
Boxers at the 1996 Summer Olympics
Commonwealth Games bronze medallists for Seychelles
Commonwealth Games medallists in boxing
Boxers at the 1990 Commonwealth Games
Boxers at the 1994 Commonwealth Games
African Games silver medalists for Seychelles
African Games medalists in boxing
Competitors at the 1995 All-Africa Games
20th-century Seychellois people
21st-century Seychellois people
Medallists at the 1994 Commonwealth Games